Theodor Paleologu (born July 15, 1973) is a Romanian historian, diplomat and politician. An independent who was formerly a member of the National Liberal Party (PNL), the People's Movement Party (PMP) and the Democratic Liberal Party (PD-L), he was a member of the Romanian Chamber of Deputies for Bucharest from 2008 to 2016. Additionally, in the first Emil Boc cabinet (December 2008 to December 2009) he was Minister of Culture, Religious Affairs and Cultural Heritage.

Early life
The son of Olimpia and Alexandru Paleologu, he was born in Bucharest and completed secondary studies at the city's German High School. He then attended University of Paris 1 Pantheon-Sorbonne from 1992 to 1998, where he obtained undergraduate and master's degrees in philosophy. He also attended the École normale supérieure from 1996 to 2001, and from 1998 to 2001, worked on a doctorate in political sciences at the School for Advanced Studies in the Social Sciences and the Ludwig Maximilian University of Munich. He was a lecturer at Boston College from 1999 to 2000, a visiting professor at Deep Springs College in 2003, and a research fellow at the University of Notre Dame (2001–2002), New York University (2002), Harvard University (2002–2003) and the Institute for Advanced Study, Berlin (2005). He was an external lecturer at the University of Copenhagen in 2007 and 2008, and since 2003 has been assistant professor and director of the summer university at the European College of Liberal Arts in Berlin. Between 2005 and 2008, he served as Romania's ambassador to Denmark and Iceland; he resigned from the office in order to pursue his successful parliamentary campaign.

Political activity
In the Chamber, he sat on the Arts, Culture and Mass Media Committee. As minister, his top priority was the preservation of Romania's historic monuments. His ministerial term ended when he was not reappointed to a new cabinet under Boc at the end of 2009. At the 2012 local election, he ran for mayor of Bucharest's Sector 1, finishing second with 14.1% of the vote. Running in the legislative election later that year, he placed second in his district, but won another term through the redistribution mechanism specified by the electoral law. In February 2014, he followed Elena Udrea in resigning from the PD-L and joining the People's Movement Party (PMP). A year later, he entered the National Liberal Party (PNL), proclaiming that the PMP had degenerated into a "total fiasco". In June 2016, the PNL expelled him after he criticized the party leadership for its disrespect toward Save Bucharest Union leader Nicușor Dan. Paleologu ran as an independent in the December election and won some 8,000 votes, well short of the approximately 25,000 needed to secure a seat. He was the PMP candidate in the 2019 presidential election, placing fifth with 5.7% of the vote.

Presidential elections

Private life
Paleologu was married to Sarah Nassif, a French opera singer of Lebanese origin. The two are divorced and have one son, Mihail.

He wrote two books, one on Carl Schmitt (2004) and one on the year 2004 in Romanian politics (2005). In 2013, he began holding private courses on the humanities and diplomacy in his family home.

Notes

1973 births
Living people
Politicians from Bucharest
Democratic Liberal Party (Romania) politicians
People's Movement Party politicians
National Liberal Party (Romania) politicians
Members of the Chamber of Deputies (Romania)
Romanian academics
Diplomats from Bucharest
21st-century Romanian historians
Members of the Romanian Orthodox Church
Romanian Ministers of Culture
Romanian writers in French
University of Paris alumni
University of Notre Dame faculty
Deep Springs College faculty
Harvard Fellows
New York University faculty
Bard College faculty